The MUD Literary Prize is an Australian literary award awarded annually at Adelaide Writers' Week since 2018 to a debut literary novel. It is sponsored by a philanthropic organisation, the MUD Literary Club, which was founded in 2012.

The organisation
The MUD Literary Club was set up by a group of philanthropists headed by businessman Tony Parkinson in 2012, its acronym arising from "Mates of Ubud", a group of people who banded together to fund the Ubud Writers & Readers Festival, which is held annually in Ubud, Bali, after a large corporate sponsor withdrew. A friend of Parkinson, Sue Tweddell, became an enthusiastic driver of the project. The new committee decided to also direct funds to Adelaide Writers' Week, an annual free event held in Adelaide, South Australia, and since then has sponsored the appearance of two authors at each festival. One of these is an established major Australian author, and the other an emerging talent.

It is the only philanthropic organisation supporting literature in Australia, and its collaboration with Writers' Week has been welcomed by the organisers. It continues to raise funds by hosting literary lunches featuring authors such as Richard Flanagan, Thomas Keneally, Hannah Kent, Kate Grenville, and many others, and also relies on several corporate sponsors as well as the subscriptions of its members, who pay  person per year.

A session entitled "MUD Literary Club: The 10th Anniversary", chaired by David Sly, was scheduled for  the 2022 edition of Writers' Week, featuring Thomas Keneally, Hannah Kent, and Christos Tsiolkas.

The prize

Prizewinners
 2018: See What I Have Done, by Sarah Schmidt a crime novel based on the notorious Lizzie Borden, who killed her parents in 1892
 2019: Boy Swallows Universe, by Trent Dalton (his first award)  
 2020: Master of My Fate, by Sienna Brown
 2021: The Dictionary of Lost Words, by Pip Williams, an Adelaide author
 2022: Love & Virtue, by Diana Reid

References

External links

Australian literary awards
Australian philanthropists
Philanthropic organizations
Australian fiction awards
Awards established in 2018
2012 establishments in Australia